In philosophy, the natural order is the moral source from which natural law seeks to derive its authority.  Natural order encompasses the natural relations of beings to one another in the absence of law, which natural law attempts to reinforce. In contrast, divine law seeks authority from God, and positive law seeks authority from government. 

The term is used by Hans-Hermann Hoppe in his book, Democracy: The God That Failed: The Economics and Politics of Monarchy, Democracy, and Natural Order, to defend anarcho-capitalism.

The term is used by Friedrich Hayek in his writings.

The Physiocrats, a group of 18th century Enlightenment French philosophers, had firm faith in the philosophy of natural order. According to them it is an ideal order given to them by God, which allowed human beings to live together in an ideal society. The natural laws are the expression of the will of God. Thus, men did not come together via a somewhat arbitrary "social contract". Rather, they had to discover the laws of the natural order that would allow them to live in a society without losing significant freedoms.

See also

 Aristocracy
 Aristotelianism
 Creator deity
 Cultural conservatism
 Ethical naturalism
 Naturalism (philosophy)
 Natural law
 Natural rights
 Organicism
 Paleolibertarianism
 Spontaneous order
 Traditionalist conservatism

References

Anarcho-capitalism
Concepts in ethics
Ethics
Natural law
Philosophy of law